Bareilly is a prominent city in Uttar Pradesh, India.

It may also mean any of the following:

India

Bareilly
 History of Bareilly
 Bareilly district, India
 Bareilly division, India
 Bareilly (Assembly constituency)
 Bareilly Cantonment (Assembly constituency)
 Bareilly (Lok Sabha constituency)
 Hindu temples in Bareilly
 Bareilly Airport
 Bareilly College
 Bareilly Junction railway station
 Bareilly Metro
 Barelvi, a Sunni-Sufi movement founded in Bareilly
 Ahmed Raza Khan Barelvi, Indian Islamic scholar, founder of the movement
 Bareilly Sharif Dargah, his tomb in Bareilly
 Dargah Tajushshariya, tomb of his great-grandson, situated near the above

Elsewhere
 Breilly, a commune in Picardie, France

See also
 Bareli (disambiguation)
 Raebareli, another city in Uttar Pradesh India
 Delhi–Bareilly Express